Bjørgen is a surname and it may refer to:
Marit Bjørgen, Norwegian cross-country skier
Randi Bjørgen, Norwegian trade unionist

Norwegian-language surnames